Gabriel Rivera (April 7, 1961 – July 16, 2018), nicknamed "Señor Sack", was an American football nose tackle in the National Football League (NFL).  Rivera played college football for Texas Tech where he earned All-American honors in 1982.  Rivera was a first-round pick in the 1983 NFL Draft by the Pittsburgh Steelers.

College
Rivera attended Texas Tech University, and played for the Texas Tech Red Raiders football team from 1979 to 1982. At 6'3" and 230 pounds, he was recruited as a tight end and linebacker before growing to between 270 and 300 pounds.  Despite his weight, Rivera was able to complete a 40-yard dash in 4.8 seconds as a noseguard. While at Texas Tech, he earned the nickname "Señor Sack".

Rivera finished his four-year career at Texas Tech with 321 tackles, 34 tackles for loss, 14 sacks, 11 pass deflections, and 6 fumble recoveries. His 1982 total of 105 tackles still holds the school record for most tackles by a defensive tackle. Rivera garnered significant national attention following a 10–3 loss against the #1 ranked 1982 Washington Huskies football team, in which he logged 10 tackles, 4 pass deflections, 4 quarterback pressures, and a sack.

In 1980, Rivera earned honorable-mention All-American honors as a sophomore. In 1982, he was recognized as a consensus first-team All-American as a senior defensive tackle. Additionally, Rivera was named the Southwest Conference Defensive Player of the Year, and would later be named to the Southwest Conference All-Decade team. He appeared in the 1982 Bob Hope Christmas Show and was introduced as an All American Defensive Lineman.

He was named to the National Football Foundation & College Hall of Fame in May 2012. He was named as the fourth member of Texas Tech's Ring of Honor on July 2, 2014, and had his name inscribed on Jones AT&T Stadium along with fellow College Football Hall of Fame members Donny Anderson, Dave Parks and E. J. Holub.

Professional career
The Pittsburgh Steelers selected Rivera in the first round (21st pick overall) of the 1983 NFL Draft. Rivera's selection was notable because the Steelers decided to pass on hometown hero and University of Pittsburgh quarterback Dan Marino as heir apparent to Terry Bradshaw. Instead, head coach Chuck Noll chose to rebuild from the defensive side as the team had done a decade earlier with "Mean" Joe Greene. Rivera was considered to be one of the fastest defensive linemen coming out of college.

As the 1983 season progressed, Rivera slowly began to come on, getting two sacks in his first six games played. But on October 20, 1983, Rivera was paralyzed in a car wreck. Driving while drunk, he crossed into another lane and collided with another vehicle. The then 22-year-old was treated for head, neck, chest and abdominal injuries, as well as significant memory loss. The crash occurred at 9:00 p.m. in Ross Township, a northern suburb of Pittsburgh. At the time, Rivera was married to Kimberly Covington; they had son Timothy Rivera three weeks later, in November.

Personal life
Rivera had three wives, Kimberly, whom he met at Texas Tech; Carmen, whom he met during physical therapy; and Nancy, whom he met at the Zoo.

He died on July 16, 2018, from complications related to  a perforated bowel.

References

External links
 

1961 births
2018 deaths
Jefferson High School (San Antonio, Texas) alumni
American football defensive tackles
Pittsburgh Steelers players
Texas Tech Red Raiders football players
All-American college football players
College Football Hall of Fame inductees
People from Crystal City, Texas
Players of American football from San Antonio
American disabled sportspeople
People with paraplegia